The Mt Stuart Wind Farm is a wind farm in New Zealand constructed by Pioneer Generation. It is located close to the settlements of Manuka Creek and Mount Stuart, 15 kilometres west of Milton in the Otago region of the South Island. It stands at an altitude of  atop the promontory which gives it its name.

Resource consents were granted in February 2010.  Construction began in April 2011
and the nine turbine wind farm was commissioned in June 2012.

See also

Wind power in New Zealand
List of power stations in New Zealand

References

External links
Mt Stuart Wind Farm

Wind farms in New Zealand
Buildings and structures in Otago